Beautiful Midnight is the third album released by the Matthew Good Band. It is the band's most commercially successful album. The album won the award for "Best Rock Album" at the 2000 Juno Awards.

The album produced four successful singles ("Hello Time Bomb", "Load Me Up", "Strange Days", and "The Future is X-Rated"). Each single was accompanied by a music video, all which received frequent airplay on Much Music. The success of Beautiful Midnight propelled Good to a celebrity status in Canada he eventually grew to loathe, and his interactions with the media throughout the promotional cycle for the record were often strained and unpleasant.

Commercial performance
Beautiful Midnight debuted at #1 on the Canadian Albums Chart, selling approximately 25,000 copies in its first week. It would go on to become the band's best-selling album, being certified Double Platinum in Canada on September 7, 2000. By March 2003, the album had sold 270,000 units in Canada. By 2016, the album had sold over 300,000 copies, achieving Triple Platinum status. Between 1996 and 2016, Beautiful Midnight was among the top 20 best-selling albums by Canadian bands in Canada.

Publicity 
The album did not achieve the kind of success in United States as it did in Canada partially due to Good being uncooperative in playing along with the media and music industry in the country.

In a 2016 interview with The Canadian Press, Good recounted one interview with Seventeen magazine at its Manhattan office where two female writers ("...who looked like the Stepford Wives") asked the singer to recall his first kiss. Annoyed by the question, he recounted a story where as a teenager where he engaged in a drunken session that became sexual. The writers, Good says, were so taken back by his explicit story that they walked out of the interview.

The band was also reluctant to commit to extensively touring the United States.

Versions 
The album was re-released in 2001 in the United States on Atlantic Records with an altered track listing with remixed songs from Underdogs. Good has referred to it as something of a greatest hits.

A number of songs considered for inclusion on Beautiful Midnight were relegated to b-side or unreleased status.  "Flashdance II" was eventually released on Loser Anthems, while "Pony Boy", which was recorded for the subsequent album The Audio of Being, remained unreleased until In a Coma in 2005.

The album was re-released in 2016 on LP and climbed to the top of the Canadian vinyl chart in January.

Sales of the LP were enough to convince Good to re-record some of the songs for a five-track EP titled I Miss New Wave: Beautiful Midnight Revisited. It was released on December 2, 2016, alongside an accompanying tour in 2017 in which Good performed the Beautiful Midnight album in its entirety. Good said he picked songs from "Beautiful Midnight" he thought could be improved or reworked to reflect "greater maturity" and more technical restraint.

Track listing
All tracks written by Matthew Good and Dave Genn, except where noted.

In the fashion of a concept album, the track listing uses the conceit that the album represents one night, with each song corresponding to a one-hour period leading from "05:00 pm" ("Giant") through midnight ("Let's Get It On") and ending with "Sunup" ("Running For Home").

US track listing
(Titles were altered by Atlantic Records)
 Giant
 Hello Time Bomb
 Strange Days
 Deep 6ix
 Load Me Up
 Failing the Rorschach Test
 Suburbia
 Apparitions
 Jenni's Song
 Boy and His ------- ---
 The Future Is X-Rated
 Everything Is Automatic
 Born to ----
 Running for Home

("Hello Time Bomb", "Strange Days", "Deep 6ix", "Load Me Up", and "Everything Is Automatic" were remixed by Chris Lord-Alge.  "Deep Six", "Apparitions", and "Everything Is Automatic" originally appeared on Underdogs.)

Credits 

Matthew Good Band
Matthew Good - vocals, guitar
Ian Browne - drums
Rich Priske - bass guitar
Geoff Lloyd - bass guitar on "Deep 6ix", "Apparitions" and "Everything Is Automatic"
Dave Genn - Guitar, Keyboards
Additional personnel
Todd Kerns - backing vocals on "Hello Time Bomb" and "Born To Kill"
Natasha Duprey - Phone Sex on "The Future is X-Rated"
Centennial High School Cheerleading Squad - Cheerleading on "Giant"
Kristy Holmes
Kimberly Barber
Melanie Barber
Sara Correia
Caroline Croteau
Kristin Sims
Karin Anstey
Tracey Mcdonald
Megan Leigh
Marjolyn Ustaris

 Production
Warne Livesey - Producer, Engineer, Mixer
Zach Blackstone - Engineer
Steve Kaplan (BJG Studios, London) - Mixer
Chris Lord-Alge (BJG Studios, London) - Mixer
Tim Young - Mastering
Legal: Simkin & Co.
Accounting: Davidson & Co.
Ken Turta - Live sound
Christi Thompson - Good's assistant
Chimo Robichaud - Instrument technician
Horshack - A&R
Jay Blakesberg - Photography
Vincent Libby - Design concept
Garnet Armstrong - Album design
Kiley Redhead - Album design

Year-end charts

References 

1999 albums
Matthew Good albums
Atlantic Records albums
Universal Music Canada albums
Albums produced by Warne Livesey
Albums recorded at Greenhouse Studios
Juno Award for Rock Album of the Year albums